Dao Lang (born 22 June 1971) is the stage name of Luo Lin, a Chinese singer from Sichuan, China.

Biography
Dao Lang's CD, 2002年的第一場雪 (The First Snows of 2002), 2002 Niande Diyi Chang Xue in pinyin, released in 2003, made him an instant star in China. He sang with Alan Tam on the debut "Can't Say Goodbye" (說不出的告別) as Cantonese version and later is bilingual between Mandarin and Cantonese. His other albums include 2001's Songs from the Western Region (see the external link below).

Dao Lang has toured the Chinese cities of Chengdu, Chongqing, and Xi'an, as well as the autonomous region of Tibet for more than four years as a young bar-hopping musician (see external link). He has been called the "Wang Luobin of the 21st century" and has performed modern rock adaptations of several of Wang Luobin's Western China-inspired folk songs, such as "Awariguli" (a Xinjiang Uyghur folk love song), "Flowers and Youth" (pinyin: Hua'er Yu Shaonian, a Hui Muslim song), and "At a Faraway Place" (pinyin: Zai Na Yaoyuan De Difang", a song from western China's Qinghai). He has also performed modern adaptations of such renowned old Chinese folk songs as "The Grapes of Turpan are Ripe" (pinyin: Tulufan De Putao Shu Liao) and the famous revolutionary song "Nanniwan".

Awards
Dao Lang is considered by Beijing Music Society in 2002 the best pop singer and artist of the year (source:www.BeijingMusicSociety.cn) the only two young artist that had received this honor are Cui Jian in 1987 and Huang Yujie in 2008.

Discography

Studio albums
2003: 西域情歌 (with 黄灿)
2004: 2002年的第一场雪
2004: 喀什噶尔胡杨
2006: 披着羊皮的狼
2006: 刀郎III
2008: 红色经典
2011: 刀郎2011 身披彩衣的姑娘

Remix albums
2006: 与郎共舞

Best albums
2004: 北方的天空下
2006: 谢谢你

External links
Daolang website
Dao Lang: I'm an Ascetic for Music

1971 births
Living people
Chinese male singer-songwriters
Chinese Mandopop singers
Mandopop singer-songwriters
People from Neijiang
Singers from Sichuan
21st-century Chinese male singers